Kasdi Merbah (16 April 1938 – 21 August 1993), whose real name is Abdallah Khalef, was an Algerian politician who served as Head of Government between 5 November 1988 and 9 September 1989 when he was a member of the National Liberation Front. He was assassinated on August 21, 1993.

Biography
Kasdi Merbah was born on the 16th of April 1938 in the province of Beni Yenni. During the 1970s and early 1980s, he was the head of the Sécurité Militaire, the Algerian state intelligence service. Before the 1988 October Riots he had served as Minister of Agriculture and then Minister of Public Health, and the following month he was appointed Prime Minister. However, during his tenure he had an increasingly fractious relationship with President Chadli Bendjedid, and was removed from office in September 1989.

Public criticism of Bendjedid led to him becoming isolated within the FLN, and in October 1990 he left the party to form the Algerian Movement for Justice and Development, known by its acronym "MAJD", meaning "glory" in Arabic. However, the party failed to win a seat in the 1991 parliamentary elections, the results of which were annulled after a military coup. Merbah appeared to be a very moderate politician and tried (secretly and overtly) to help in finding a solution for the Algerian Civil War that followed the coup. A great number of analysts attribute his assassination to his past in the security services and the many state secrets he possessed, beside the apparent moderate posture he had adopted with regard to dealing with the Islamist movements, particularly the FIS who went for the armed option.

References

1938 births
1993 deaths
Assassinated Algerian politicians
Algerian Berber politicians
People murdered in Algeria
Kabyle people
National Liberation Front (Algeria) politicians
People from Tizi Ouzou Province
Agriculture ministers of Algeria
Health ministers of Algeria
Public health ministers
20th-century Algerian politicians
Algerian intelligence agency personnel
Directors of intelligence agencies